Hazel Crowney, also spelt as Hazel Croney, is a British model and film actress who has appeared in many ad campaigns and some Bollywood films.

Early life
Crowney was born in London, United Kingdom, to English parents Karin and Phil Crowney. she has two younger sisters (one named Robyn). Crowney grew up in Grosvenor Park, Chester, England; she completed her schooling at Bennett Memorial School in Tunbridge Wells, and later studied fashion and textiles at West Kent College.

Career
Crowney's entry into Bollywood came by chance in 2004 when she was backpacking in Thailand and stumbled upon an Indian film being shot there. So it came that her first appearance in a Bollywood film was in the item song "Leke Pehla Pehla Pyaar". She was an extra in the film Janasheen. With little prior knowledge of the sub-continent, she was attracted by the music and dance, and decided to try her luck in Mumbai.

She went on to do advertisements for Pond's, Nokia, HSBC and Samsung before landing her first proper role in the film MP3: Mera Pehla Pehla Pyaar in 2007. She also worked in shows, for which she was highly paid.

In 2010, Crowney along with other non-Indian actresses such as Alice Patten were asked to leave Bollywood by Raj Thackeray's Maharashtra Navnirman Sena (MNS), a Mumbai-based political party. They campaigned for a ban on the estimated 1,000 British and other foreign actors who regularly appear in Bollywood films accusing them of stealing jobs from local girls.

Crowney has performed in an item song named 'Reshma Ki Jawani' for the film Kaash Tum Hote which was released in 2014. She also appeared in an item song in the Telugu action-drama Shankara, which was released in 2016.

Filmography

Films

Television appearances

References

External links
 
 

Living people
Actresses from London
English film actresses
English female models
English expatriates in India
Actresses in Hindi cinema
Actresses in Tamil cinema
Actresses in Telugu cinema
Actresses in Marathi cinema
British expatriate actresses in India
European actresses in India
Actresses of European descent in Indian films
21st-century English actresses
21st-century British actresses
Year of birth missing (living people)